Jorge Martín Montenegro Adaro (born 7 May 1983) is an Argentinian-born Spanish cyclist. He was suspended for doping from February until July 2017. He rode in the 2010 Vuelta a España, finishing in 150th place.

Major results

2005
1st  Road race, National Under-23 Road Championships
2007
1st Stage 5 Vuelta Ciclista a León
2008
1st Stage 2 Vuelta Ciclista a León
2009
6th Overall Vuelta al Ecuador
2010
7th Dwars door Drenthe
7th Clásica de Almería
2012
1st Stage 1 Volta ao Alentejo
2014
6th Vuelta Ciclista a La Rioja

References

External links

1983 births
Living people
Spanish male cyclists
Argentine male cyclists